Gilbert Jeremy Gottfried (February 28, 1955 – April 12, 2022) was an American stand-up comedian and actor, known for his exaggerated shrill voice, strong New York accent, and his edgy, often controversial, sense of humor. His numerous roles in film and television include voicing Iago in the Aladdin animated franchise, Digit LeBoid in Cyberchase, Kraang Subprime in Teenage Mutant Ninja Turtles, and the Aflac Duck. He was also known for his role as Mr. Peabody in the Problem Child film series.

Gottfried hosted the podcast Gilbert Gottfried's Amazing Colossal Podcast (2014–2022), which featured discussions of classic films and celebrity interviews, most often with veteran actors, comedians, musicians, and comedy writers. The documentary Gilbert (2017) explored his life and career; it won the Special Jury Prize for Best Documentary at the 2017 deadCENTER Film Festival.

Early life
Gilbert Jeremy Gottfried was born on February 28, 1955, in the Coney Island section of the Brooklyn borough of New York City, the son of homemaker Lillian Zimmerman and hardware store owner Max Gottfried. His father and grandfather ran the store, above which the family lived. He was raised in a Jewish family but later said of his unusual upbringing, "I ate pork. We weren't that aware of the holidays or anything like that, but were aware of being Jewish. It's like I kind of knew that even though I was never bar mitzvahed and we didn't follow the holidays, I knew that if the Nazis came back, I'd be in the same train coach with everyone else." He was the younger brother of Karen and photographer Arlene Gottfried (1950–2017). From Coney Island, the family moved to Brooklyn's Crown Heights, followed by Borough Park.

Career
Gottfried's first routine on stage was at The Bitter End in Greenwich Village, during one of its Hootenanny Night events, when he was fifteen. His two sisters accompanied him, having thought the performances their brother did for the family were good enough for the stage and encouraged him to try it out. His early routines focused on impressions of old time actors and celebrities, including Boris Karloff and Humphrey Bogart. From there he worked the local comedy circuit and became known in the area as a "comedian's comedian", and started to perform edgier material when he got bored of his usual routines. One such incident occurred when Gottfried opened for Belinda Carlisle, which was attended by younger girls and their mothers: "I tried doing my regular act for about five minutes, then I just launched into the filthiest stuff I could think of. And the next day, I got a call from my agent saying 'Everybody there loved you', which is show business talk for, 'You're fired.'

In 1980, Saturday Night Live was being retooled with a new staff and new comedians; the producers noticed Gottfried and hired him as a cast member for season 6. Gottfried's persona during SNL sketches was very different from his later characterization: He rarely spoke in his trademark obnoxiously screeching voice and never squinted. During his 12-episode stint, he was seldom used in sketches. Gottfried recalled that a low point was having to play a corpse in a sketch about a sports organist hired to play inappropriate music at a funeral. He did have one recurring character (Leo Waxman, husband to Denny Dillon's Pinky Waxman on the recurring talk show sketch, "What's It All About?") and two celebrity impersonations: David Stockman and Roman Polanski.

In April 1987, Gottfried headlined a half-hour comedy special that aired as part of the Cinemax Comedy Experiment series. It was followed by the sitcom pilot Norman's Corner, co-written by Larry David prior to creating Seinfeld, which saw Gottfried as the titular character. Gottfried played accountant Sidney Bernstein in the 1987 film Beverly Hills Cop II, in which he reunited with friend and fellow SNL alumnus Eddie Murphy. Also in 1987, Gottfried made his debut appearance on The Howard Stern Show. He went on to make over 100 appearances on the radio show over the next 25 years.

Although not a regular, Gottfried appeared in The Amazing Live Sea Monkeys, as well as the voice of Jerry the Belly Button Elf on Ren and Stimpy. Three of his most prominent roles came in 1990, 1991, and 1992, when he was cast as the adoption agent Igor Peabody in Problem Child and Problem Child 2, and Iago. When asked how he prepared for the role, Gottfried joked, "I did the whole DeNiro thing. I moved to South America! I lived in the trees!" Gottfried reprised the role in The Return of Jafar, Aladdin and the King of Thieves, the television series and various related media, such as Kingdom Hearts and House of Mouse. However, the character was ultimately recast to Alan Tudyk for the 2019 remake. He also voiced Berkeley Beetle in 1994's Thumbelina. He was the host of the Saturday edition of USA Up All Night for its entire run from 1989 to 1998.

Gottfried was a recurring guest star during the Tom Bergeron era of Hollywood Squares and became the center of attention in a bizarre episode that aired October 1, 1999. In this episode, the two contestants made nine consecutive incorrect guesses, six of which were to be game-deciding questions asked to Gottfried. As the only remaining square left, whoever captured him would have five squares and thus, win the game. Magician Penn Jillette, who was a guest alongside his magic partner Teller on the same episode, berated a contestant earlier for giving an incorrect guess by shouting, "You fool!" Gottfried himself then began to use the phrase, with most of the other stars (including Bergeron himself) eventually joining in with every successive wrong guess, beginning with the second question he was asked. As a consequence, it took the episode's entire half hour to play only one game; however, he was eventually captured on the last possible question. Appropriately, the episode became known as the "You Fool!" episode. Gottfried was temporarily fired from Hollywood Squares after this incident, returning about a month later.

Gottfried provided the voice of the duck in the Aflac commercials and Digit in Cyberchase, as well as Dr. Bender and his son Wendell in The Fairly OddParents, and Mister Mxyzptlk (pronounced "Mikz-yez-pit-lik") in Superman: The Animated Series. He reprised his role as Mxyzptlk in Lego Batman 3: Beyond Gotham, Justice League Action, and Lego DC Super-Villains. He also played a nasty wisecracking criminal genius named Nick Knack in two episodes of Superboy (he also co-wrote an issue of Superboy, which featured Nick Knack's origin). Gottfried made regular appearances on The Tonight Show with Jay Leno.

In 2004, Comedy Central featured Gottfried's stand-up material for Shorties Watchin' Shorties. Gottfried was part of an online advertising campaign for Microsoft's Office XP software, showing, in a series of Flash-animated cartoons, that the Clippy office assistant would be removed. In 2006, Gottfried topped the Boston Phoenix's tongue-in-cheek list of the world's 100 Unsexiest Men. In April 2006, Gottfried performed with the University of Pennsylvania's Mask and Wig Club in their annual Intercollegiate Comedy Festival. Also in 2006, he made an appearance on the Let's Make a Deal portion of Gameshow Marathon (as a baby in a large high chair, he says "Hey Ricki, I think I need my diaper changed!"), and in the Dodge Viper in the big deal (where he tells the contestants "What were you thinking?!" because neither one picked it). He also guest-starred in The Grim Adventures of Billy and Mandy as Santa Claus in the one-hour Christmas Special. He voiced Rick Platypus in an episode of My Gym Partner's a Monkey entitled "That Darn Platypus".

He appeared as Peter’s horse in an episode of Family Guy entitled "Boys Do Cry" (in which Peter Griffin is enthused to learn that Gottfried is providing the horse's voice). He also guest-starred in Hannah Montana as Barny Bittmen. In January 2009, Gottfried worked again with David Faustino for an episode of Faustino's show Star-ving. In 2011, Gottfried appeared in the episode "Lost Traveller" on Law & Order: Special Victims Unit as Leo Gerber, a sarcastic computer professional working for the NYPD's Technical Assistance Response Unit, which producer Warren Leight said could become a recurring character. Gottfried read a section from the hit book Fifty Shades of Grey in a June 2012 YouTube video, which was created with the aim of using Gottfried's trademark voice to make fun of the book's graphic sexual content.

In 2011, Gottfried published his only book Rubber Balls and Liquor.

In 2013, he became a member of "Team Rachael" on the second season of Food Network's Rachael vs. Guy: Celebrity Cook-Off. In March that year he appeared on ABC's Celebrity Wife Swap. He swapped wives with Alan Thicke. He was also a commentator on truTV Presents: World's Dumbest....

On May 28, 2014, Sideshow Network premiered Gilbert Gottfried's Amazing Colossal Podcast, an interview series where Gottfried and his co-host Frank Santopadre discussed classic films and talk to "Hollywood legends and behind-the-scenes talents" who shaped Gottfried's childhood and influenced his comedy. His first guest was Dick Cavett. His final guest was Brenda Vaccaro, in a two part episode released on April 25 and May 2, 2022. Gottfried would be hospitalized a few hours after the episode's recording. Since Gottfried's death, the podcast continued by re-uploading older episodes in honor of his legacy.

Gottfried was the third contestant fired during the fourteenth season of the NBC reality show The Celebrity Apprentice. In 2016 he played the 'Pig Man' in a comedy/fantasy film Abnormal Attraction. In 2017 he appeared as himself in Episodes, where a contestant on a fictional TV endurance game show is penalized with "48 hours of Gilbert Gottfried".

On June 10, 2018, Gottfried appeared in a special segment of Last Week Tonight with John Oliver where, for UK viewers only, a segment about the UK's law restricting broadcast of debates from the Houses of Parliament was replaced by five minutes of him reading "3-star Yelp reviews" along with host John Oliver telling the audience "you brought this on yourself because of your stupid law". He returned on November 18, 2018, in the show's last episode of the year to read out extracts from the Brexit agreement, again for UK viewers only. He had previously performed as "the real voice of Jared Kushner" in dubbed film clips on the show.

On July 31, 2019, Gottfried appeared as a guest in episode 170 of the Angry Video Game Nerd. On January 10, 2022, he guest-starred as God on the season finale of Smiling Friends.

In 2022 he appears in the Somebody Feed Phil season 6 episode Croatia in the ‘Joke for Max’ segment on a video call with the show host Philip Rosenthal where he tells a few jokes in honour of Phils late father Max.

Released in October 2022,The Paloni Show! Halloween Special includes a skit with Gottfried voicing an "apartment manager who doesn't want to deal with his tenants." Some report this as his last performance.

Style and legacy
Danny Gallagher of the Dallas Observer wrote that "Gottfried has one of the most original formulas in the history of comedy", adding, "You don't just laugh at the punchline when Gilbert Gottfried tells a joke. You laugh at the setup. You laugh at his comments about the joke. You even laugh at the segues between his jokes." Eric Falwell wrote of his influence in The Atlantic: "Gottfried's work as a stand-up shaped many comics today, whether they would say as much or not. He was a figure who ... pushed stand-up to move beyond the realm of the merely observational and create space for the absurd."  In 2022, the Jewish Journal named him one of "The Top 10 Jewish Reality TV Stars of All Time."

Gottfried was known for speaking in a loud and grating voice, which was not his natural speaking voice. Mark Binneli of Rolling Stone described Gottfried as a "squinting, squawking mass of contradictions", noting his status as "one of America's filthiest stand-ups" while simultaneously being "one of the most successful voice-over artists in children's entertainment". He was also known for joking about recent tragedies, prompting fellow comedian Bill Maher to dub him the "King of Too Soon". In a July 2012 op-ed for CNN, he wrote, "I have always felt comedy and tragedy are roommates. If you look up comedy and tragedy, you will find a very old picture of two masks. One mask is tragedy. It looks like it's crying. The other mask is comedy. It looks like it's laughing. Nowadays, we would say, 'How tasteless and insensitive. A comedy mask is laughing at a tragedy mask.'"

Incidents

1991 Emmy Awards performance
At the 43rd Primetime Emmy Awards, Gottfried told a series of masturbation jokes in reference to Paul Reubens’ arrest for masturbating in an adult theater. Viewers in the Eastern time zone saw the entire set live, but Fox censored the broadcast for the West Coast delay. Fox issued an apology, calling the jokes "irresponsible and insulting". Gottfried said that producers stated he would not be invited back, and Rolling Stone wrote that the monologue resulted in his blacklisting.

9/11 joke and The Aristocrats

During his monologue at a Friars Club roast of Hugh Hefner three weeks after the September 11 attacks, Gottfried joked that he had intended to catch a plane but could not get a direct flight because "they said they have to stop at the Empire State Building first". This was one of the first public examples of 9/11 humor. Audience members responded with hisses and a cry of "too soon!". Realizing he had lost the audience "bigger than anybody has ever lost an audience", Gottfried abandoned his prepared remarks and launched into the famous Aristocrats joke, which won back the audience. Penn Jillette and Paul Provenza used Gottfried's monologue as a segment in their 2005 film The Aristocrats.

Aflac firing
In March 2011, Gottfried tweeted twelve jokes about the earthquake disaster in Japan. Aflac, which does 75% of its business in Japan, responded by dismissing Gottfried from voicing its mascot and announcing a casting call for his replacement. He was replaced by Daniel McKeague (who did an impression of Gottfried) on April 26, 2011.

Podcast
Gilbert Gottfried's Amazing Colossal Podcast launched on June 1, 2014. GGACP was a long form interview podcast and was hosted by not only Gottfried, but his friend and professional comedy writer, Frank Santopadre. Gottfried's wife, Dara, served as executive producer, and it was recorded weekly until his death in 2022 (with re-uploads of older episodes continuing afterwards in honor of his legacy).  

Standard episodes ran about an hour in length and featured interviews with a variety of entertainers, writers, and directors including: Dick Cavett. Tippi Hedren, George Takei, Brenda Vaccaro, Bob Costas, Susie Essman, Dick Van Dyke, Alan Arkin, Phil Rosenthal, Lee Grant and many more. Several guests made more than one appearance, but none more often than Mario Cantone. Cantone would annually help Gottfried and Santopadre celebrate the Christmas season with a mixture of songs, jokes and cheer. 

Its title, the 'Amazing Colossal Podcast,' is a reference to the 1957 black-and-white science fiction film The Amazing Colossal Man directed by Bert I. Gordon. Gottfried's chaotic comedic riffing and Santopadre's earnest interviewing offered the show a style all its own. 

Starting in 2015, the podcast featured shorter mini-episodes around half an hour in length on more specific topics like particular character actors, films, or songs. The mini-episodes were later rebranded as Amazing Colossal Obsessions.

Personal life
In 1992, Gottfried suffered from Appendicitis and was rushed to hospital for emergency surgery and the treatment was a success.

In the late 1990s, Gottfried met Dara Kravitz at a Grammy Awards party. They were married in 2007 and had a daughter named Lily and a son named Max; both were named after his parents. He was a longtime resident of the Chelsea neighborhood of Manhattan.

Gottfried was known for his frugality. He often walked instead of using public transportation, because he did not want to pay the fares; illustrator Drew Friedman also recalled that Gottfried would visit his apartment unannounced in the late 1980s to watch films on his VCR, because he did not want to buy one himself.

Death
On April 12, 2022, at the age of 67, Gottfried died in Manhattan from recurrent ventricular tachycardia, complicated by type II myotonic dystrophy. He had not made his condition public.

Gottfried was scheduled to appear as a special guest at the Ebertfest film festival to discuss the documentary film about him, Gilbert. In the aftermath of his death, Ebertfest announced it would be dedicating their 2022 event to the memories of Gottfried and Sidney Poitier. He was also posthumously inducted into the Rondo Hatton Classic Horror Awards' Monster Kid Hall of Fame.

Discography

Filmography

Film

Television

Video games

Web

Commercials
 MTV (1980s)
 Pepsi (1991)
Pop-Tarts: Voice of the Toaster (1995)
Aflac: Voice of the Aflac duck (2000–2011)
Subway (2000)
 Office XP: Voice of Clippy (2001)
 Glad (2003)
 Shoedini (2010)
 Easterns Automotive Group commercials (2012)
 Eat24 (2015 Super Bowl commercial)

References

External links

 
 
 
 
 

1955 births
2022 deaths
20th-century American comedians
20th-century American male actors
21st-century American comedians
21st-century American male actors
21st-century American Jews
American male comedians
American male film actors
American male television actors
American male video game actors
American male voice actors
American podcasters
American sketch comedians
American stand-up comedians
American television hosts
Comedians from New York City
Deaths from ventricular tachycardia
Deaths from muscular dystrophy
Jewish American male actors
Jewish American male comedians
Jewish male comedians
Male actors from New York City
Neurological disease deaths in New York (state)
Participants in American reality television series
People from Coney Island
People from Chelsea, Manhattan
The Apprentice (franchise) contestants